Leah D. Daughtry is an American political operative.

She was the CEO of the 2016 and 2008 Democratic National Convention Committees, and the chief of staff to Howard Dean, the former chairman of the Democratic National Committee.

Early life 
A native of Brooklyn, New York, Daughtry is the daughter of Herbert Daughtry and Karen Smith Daughtry.

Daughtry graduated from Dartmouth College in 1984 and Wesley Theological Seminary in Washington, DC in 2012.

In October 2019, she was consecrated to the office of Bishop and installed as the fourth National Presiding Prelate of The House of the Lord Churches, succeeding her father. She was named by Religion News Service one of the 12 most influential Democrats in the nation on faith and values politics.  She has also served as Resident Fellow at Harvard University’s Institute of Politics, where she focused on the role that faith and values play in American politics.

Career 
She was formerly Acting Assistant Secretary for Administration and Management at the United States Department of Labor. She directs the Democratic Party's Faith in Action initiative to reach out to Protestant, Catholic, Jewish, and Muslim voters. In the 2008 DNC convention, Daughtry as convention CEO, denied non-religious groups participation in the interfaith service.

Daughtry is the coauthor—with Donna Brazile, Yolanda Caraway, and Minyon Moore—of For Colored Girls Who Have Considered Politics (2018), a joint history and biography. In it, four of the most powerful African American women in politics share the story of their friendship and how it has changed politics in America.

She is Principal of On These Things, LLC which supports a broad array of businesses and organizations with strategic planning, project management, and community engagement activities.

Reverend Daughtry serves as an Equity Advisor for Sephora, and on the Editorial Board of the Global Women's Forum for the Economy and Society. She is Founder and Co-Convenor of Power Rising, which supports Black women in leveraging their economic, social, and political power. She sits on the Boards of Directors of the National Council of Negro Women, Higher Heights for America, and the Samuel Dewitt Proctor Conference and she is Co-Founder and Co-Chair of  Black Church PAC and Co-Chair of the Connections Committee of Alpha Kappa Alpha (Psi Zeta Omega chapter).

References

Further reading

External links

2008 Democratic National Convention
American Pentecostals
Dartmouth College alumni
Living people
United States Department of Labor officials
Washington, D.C., Democrats
Women in Washington, D.C., politics
Year of birth missing (living people)
21st-century American women